Lowell is an unincorporated community in Adams Township, Seneca County, Ohio, United States. It is located at the intersection of State Routes 101 and 778.

History
A former variant name of Lowell was Adams. A post office called Adams was established in 1827, and remained in operation until 1879.

References

Unincorporated communities in Ohio
Unincorporated communities in Seneca County, Ohio